Damergidda is a panchayat village in Ranga Reddy district, Telangana, India.  It falls under Chevella mandal, and is the only village in the gram panchayat.

References

Villages in Ranga Reddy district